North West Arm is a community in the Canadian province of Nova Scotia, located in the Cape Breton Regional Municipality.

Notable people
Theresa MacCuish: Former Canadian Interuniversity Sport Women's Basketball points record holder. Member of Nova Scotia Sports Hall of Fame, Cape Breton Sports Hall of Fame and St. Francis Xavier University Sports Hall of Fame.

References
  North West Arm on Destination Nova Scotia

Communities in the Cape Breton Regional Municipality
General Service Areas in Nova Scotia